Nikolai Zarubin ( (February 13, 1948, Altai – 1998, Perm)) is a prominent Russian artist, a bright representative of the national tradition of philosophic art.

Zarubin’s paintings represent his contemplations on the dialectics of existence, the nature of the all-embracing unity, the regularity of cosmic laws, and similar problems.

Most of his creative life the artist lived in the city of Perm, the Ural. The last nine years of his life were the most fruitful: he created his most powerful canvasses, such as Carthage. Might and Its Futility, The Star of Bethlehem, Egregore (Patron) of Perm, Earthly Incarnation, etc.

External links
 Artist with a Star of His Own. Nikolai Zarubin
 "Воплощение времени", Новый компаньон, 11 February 2003
 "Приходивший", Аргументы и факты, 13 August 2008
 "Памяти мастера", Стихи. ру, 10 November 2008
 "Выставочный зал современного искусства им. Николая Зарубина", Izi travel. The Storytelling Playform , 10 November 2008
  "Зарубин Николай Александрович", Забытые имена Пермской губернии, 22 July 2018
 "Зарубин Николай Александрович", Художественная галерея «Пермский период», 22 May 2020

20th-century Russian painters
Russian male painters
People from Perm, Russia
1948 births
1998 deaths
20th-century Russian male artists